Khalil al-Rifaei is a former member of the People's Council of Syria from Daraa. Along with fellow parliamentarian Naser al-Hariri, also from Daraa, he resigned from his seat in protest at the "continued killings of protesters during the 2011 protests in Syria".

References

Members of the People's Assembly of Syria
People from Daraa
21st-century Syrian politicians
Living people
Year of birth missing (living people)